Ptolemy's Handy Tables or Ptolemaiou Procheiroi kanones is a collection of astronomical tables that second century astronomer Ptolemy created after finishing the Almagest. The Handy Tables elaborated the astronomical tables of the Almagest and included usage instructions, but left out the theoretical commentary in order to facilitate practical computation. The work is considered of high significance during the late antiquity and in the Middle Eastern and Eastern Mediterranean medieval traditions.

References 

Ancient astronomy
Stellar astronomy